Sozvezdie (Constellation), a joint-stock company also referred to as JSC Concern Sozvezdie, is the leading Russian developer and manufacturer of electronic warfare, radio communications, and electronic countermeasures systems and equipment. Its headquarters are in Voronezh.

History
The Voronezh Scientific Research Institute of Communication (VNIIS) was founded in Voronezh in 1958, and Sozvezdie is headquartered in this city.

In 1963 Sozvezdie was the first in the world to create a fully-fledged mobile communications system.

The organization  was founded on July 29, 2004 by Decree of the Russian President. It has developed Russia's new multi-functional electronic warfare weapon system.

On July 16, 2014, the Obama administration imposed sanctions through the US Department of Treasury's Office of Foreign Assets Control (OFAC) by adding Concern Sozvezdie and other entities to the Specially Designated Nationals List (SDN) in retaliation for the ongoing Russo-Ukrainian War.

Structure
Apart from VNIIS, Sozvezdie includes the following enterprises and scientific research institutes:

 JSC TNIIR 'Efir'
 JSC Sarapul radiozavod
 JSC Tambov plant 'Revtrud'
 JSC Elektroautomatika
 JSC NPP 'Start'
 JSC Tambov plant 'October'
 JSC 'Luch' Plant
 JSC Ryazanskiy radiozavod
 JSC Slavgorod plant of radioequipment
 JSC Almaz
 JSC Voronezh Central KB 'Polyus'
 JSC VNII 'Vega'
 JSC NPP 'Volna'
 JSC 'Yantar' plant
 JSC Krasnodar instrumentation plant 'Kaskade'
 JSC Krasnodar KB  'Selena'
 JSC 'KB of experimental works'

See also 
 Almaz-Antey

References

1958 establishments in Russia
Technology companies established in 1958
Companies based in Voronezh
Electronics companies of Russia
United Instrument Manufacturing Corporation
Russian entities subject to the U.S. Department of the Treasury sanctions
Electronics companies of the Soviet Union